William John Kirton (2 December 1896 – 27 September 1970) was a footballer in the early years of professional football in England, who played over 200 games for Aston Villa and is best known for scoring the only goal in the 1920 FA Cup Final.

Football career
Kirton was born in Newcastle upon Tyne. Kirton was a member of the Temperance Society and played for Pandon Temperance before joining Leeds City in May 1919. After Kirton had played only one game for the club, City went out of business and he was transferred to Aston Villa for £500 in October 1919.

In the 1919–20 season Aston Villa enjoyed a successful run in the FA Cup beating QPR (2-1), Manchester United (2-1), Sunderland (1-0), Tottenham Hotspur (1-0) and Chelsea (3-1).

Aston Villa played Huddersfield Town in the final at Stamford Bridge. Kirton scored the only goal of the game and Villa won the cup for the sixth time in its history.

Kirton won his first and only international cap for England against Northern Ireland on 22 October 1921, scoring England's only goal in a 1–1 draw.

Kirton, a talented inside-forward, formed a productive partnership with Clem Stephenson. A teetotaller and non-smoker, he scored 59 goals in 261 appearances before signing for Coventry City in September 1928. However, he failed to score for his new club in 16 games and left to join Kidderminster Harriers.

After retiring from professional football, Kirton ran a newsagent's shop in Great Barr, Birmingham.

Kirton died in Sutton Coldfield on 27 September 1970.

References
Billy Kirton's Bio

Aston Villa F.C. players
Leeds City F.C. players
Coventry City F.C. players
Kidderminster Harriers F.C. players
English footballers
England international footballers
1896 births
Footballers from Newcastle upon Tyne
1970 deaths
People from Great Barr
Association football inside forwards
FA Cup Final players